Snežana Nikšić (30 November 1943 – 2 April 2022) was a Serbian film and television actress. She was born in Niš, part of German-occupied Serbia.

She was married to Ljuba Tadić.

Selected filmography
 1962 – Siberian Lady Macbeth
 1967 – Volite se ljudi (TV series)
 1968 – Sačulatac (TV series)
 1968-1969 – TV Bukvar (TV series) 
 1969 –  (TV movie) 
 1978 – The Tiger
 1980 – Majstori, majstori (All that Jack's)
 1985 – Poetesa (TV movie) 
 1988-1991 – Bolji život (TV series) 
 1989 – Bunker Palace Hôtel
 1991 – 
 1993 – Ruski car (TV movie) 
 1994 – Life and Literature - Danilo Kis (TV short) 
 1996 – To se samo svici igraju (TV mini-series) 
 2007 – The Reject 2012 – Nema Aviona Za Zagreb''

References

External links
 
 Snezana Niksic at testament-films.rs

1943 births
2022 deaths
Serbian television actresses
Serbian film actresses
Yugoslav actors
Actors from Niš
Golden Arena winners
University of Arts in Belgrade alumni